Pete Catan (born November 12, 1957) is a former American football player. He was one of the Houston Gamblers' leaders in quarterback sacks in 1985, Pete was credited with 20 sacks for losses totaling 146 1/2 yards in 1984. He was captain and 3-year All-American at Eastern Illinois University.

References
 DVC

External links
Just Sports Stats

Living people
1957 births
Players of American football from New York (state)
American football defensive ends
Canadian football defensive linemen
American players of Canadian football
Eastern Illinois Panthers football players
Winnipeg Blue Bombers players
Houston Gamblers players
Hamilton Tiger-Cats players
Sportspeople from Rochester, New York